The Conference Board of Canada is a Canadian not-for-profit think tank dedicated to researching and analyzing economic trends, as well as organizational performance and public policy issues.

Describing itself as "objective" and "non-partisan", the Conference Board of Canada claims not to lobby for special interests. It is funded through fees charged for services delivered to the private and public sectors alike.  The organization conducts, publishes and disseminates research on various topics of interest to its members. It publishes research reports, conducts meetings, holds conferences and provides on-line information services, which aim to develop individual leadership skills and organizational capacity.

The Conference Board of Canada was established in 1954 as a division of the American National Industrial Conference Board, now simply known as The Conference Board.  The Conference Board of Canada acquired a separate legal identity in 1981, and currently has over 200 employees, mostly based out of its main office in Ottawa. It is currently registered as a Canadian charitable organization and maintains a presence across Canada with an office in Calgary and an affiliate in Quebec, L'Institut du Québec.

Dr. Susan Black is the President and Chief Executive Officer of The Conference Board of Canada.

Services
 e-Library: Research reports, webinars and conference proceedings available to subscribers.
 e-Data: Data underlying the Conference Board's economic forecasts. U.S., Canadian, Provincial, Territorial, 28 Canadian Census Metropolitan Areas, and 16 Canadian Industries.
 Conferences: Conferences, seminars and workshops on various themes related to Conference Board research.
 Networks: Executive networks, councils, centres and working groups on various topics.
 Leadership development: Programs and courses delivered through Conference Board affiliate, the Niagara Institute.
 Custom Research
 Multi-Year Initiatives: Centre for Food in Canada, How Canada Performs, Centre for the North, Centre for Business Innovation, Canadian Alliance for Sustainable Health Care, Saskatchewan Institute, CIBC Scholar-in-Residence.

Past Presidents

 Daniel Muzyka 2012–2018
 Anne Golden 2001–2012
 James R. Nininger 1978–2001
 Robert de Cotret 1976–1978
 Arthur J.R. Smith 1971–1976
 Monteath Douglas 1954–1971

Honorary Associate Award
The Honorary Associate Award is The Conference Board of Canada's highest Award and is conferred upon individuals who have served both their organization and their country with distinction during their working career. This office, the term of which is life, is the only honour conferred by The Conference Board of Canada. Honorary Associates become voting members of the corporation. The Award is given on the occasion of the Conference Board's Annual Meeting.

Recipients
 2015 L. Jacques Ménard
 2014 Michael H. McCain
 2013 The Hon. David L. Emerson
 2012 Anne Golden
 2011 Serge Godin
 2010 Paul M. Tellier
 2009 Michael Wilson
 2008 Stephen G. Snyder
 2007 John E. Cleghorn
 2006 Jacques Lamarre
 2005 Isadore Sharp
 2004 Eric P. Newell
 2003 Purdy Crawford
 2002 Laurent Beaudoin
 2001 James R. Nininger
 2000 J.E. (Ted) Newall
 1999 Allan R. Taylor
 1998 Guy Saint-Pierre
 1997 Alfred Powis	
 1996 The Hon. Peter Lougheed
 1995 Sonja Bata and Thomas J. Bata
 1994 Paul Paré
 1993 David M. Culver
 1992 Sylvia Ostry
 1991 Camille A. Dagenais
 1990 Walter F. Light
 1989 A. Jean de Grandpré
 1988 Robert B. Bryce
 1987 Frederick C. Mannix
 1986 The Hon. Senator H. de M. Molson
 1985 Louis Rasminsky 	
 1984 The Hon. Ernest Manning
 1983 Herbert Lank
 1982 Allen T. Lambert 	
 1981 Earle McLaughlin
 1980 William O. Twaits

Selected publications
 2012 Survey Findings: The State of Firm-Level Innovation in Canada (2013)
 Improving Food Safety in Canada: Toward a More Risk-Responsive System (2012)
 Ontario's Economic and Fiscal Prospects: Challenging Times Ahead (2012)
 Women in Senior Management: Where Are They? (2011)
 21st Century Cities in Canada: The Geography of Innovation (2009)
 Healthy People, Healthy Performance, Healthy Profits: The Case for Business Action on the Socio-Economic Determinants of Health  (2008)
The International Forum on the Creative Economy (2008)
 Red Tape, Red Flags: Regulation for the Innovation Age (2007)
 How Canada Performs: A Report Card on Canada (2007)
 Mission Possible: Sustainable Prosperity for Canada (2007)
 Canada by Picasso: The Faces of Federalism (2006)

Periodicals
 Compensation Planning Outlook
 Benefits Outlook
 HR Trends and Metrics
 Industrial Relations Outlook
 Canadian Directorship Practices
 Learning and Development Outlook
 Canadian Economic Outlook
 Provincial Economic Outlook
 Metropolitan Economic Outlook
 U.S. Outlook
 World Outlook
 Index of Consumer Confidence
 Index of Business Confidence

Plagiarism controversy
In May 2009, The Conference Board of Canada was criticised over its claim to be objective and non-partisan. It released a report related to copyright regulations in Canada, which plagiarised papers published by the International Intellectual Property Alliance (the primary movie, music, and software lobby in the US). The Conference Board responded, standing by its report, which drew further criticism, claiming they ignored a commissioned report, for partisan reasons. The Conference Board recalled the reports after conducting an internal review, which determined that there was undue reliance on feedback from a funder of the report. The Conference Board hosted a roundtable discussion on intellectual property in September 2009 and published a new report, Intellectual Property in the 21st Century, in February 2010.

Stereotyping controversy
In November 2016, a recording surfaced of Michael Bloom, the Vice-President of The Conference Board, which contained a number of generalizing statements about indigenous peoples, people of Caribbean, Asian, and middle-eastern descent. The statements were made in the presence of an employee that is of indigenous heritage. Upon learning of the recording, The Conference Board of Canada placed the Vice-President on immediate leave of absence and initiated an internal investigation.

Shortly after the recording was made public, it was further revealed that a former employee commenced legal action against The Conference Board of Canada. This employee had worked under Michael Bloom and alleged a "toxic work environment". The former employee was also of indigenous heritage. A lawsuit was filed in Ontario and sought $175,000 in damages.

References

External links
 Conference Board of Canada - official website
 Policy.ca - Conference Board of Canada Organization Profile

Business organizations based in Canada
Think tanks based in Canada
Political and economic think tanks based in Canada
Charities based in Canada